Statistics of Swiss Super League in the 1979–80 season.

Overview
It was contested by 14 teams, and FC Basel won the championship.

First stage

Table

Results

Playoff

Table

Results

Sources
 Switzerland 1979–80 at RSSSF

Swiss Football League seasons
Swiss
1979–80 in Swiss football